Old Pelion Hut is an alpine hut located in Cradle Mountain-Lake St Clair National Park in the Central Highlands of Tasmania. It was built for the Mount Pelion Copper Mining Company at around 1936.

In 1980, the hut and its surroundings (i.e.  radius) were listed on the now-defunct Register of the National Estate.  As of 2019, the hut is included as part of  the listing for the Pelion Copper Mine on the Tasmanian Heritage Register.

References

External links
 Recreation - The Overland Track: Huts and Fuel Stoves

Mountain huts in Australia
Tasmanian places listed on the defunct Register of the National Estate